The Castelao Medal (Galician: Medalla Castelao) is an award presented by the Xunta de Galicia to honour the people and institutions that have created exceptional works in the arts, culture, literature, science, or in any other field that is worthy of distinction. The award can be bestowed upon Galicians whether they reside in Galicia or abroad.

Description 

The award was conceived in 1984 and is presented annually on 28 June. The date coincides with the return of the remains of writer and politician Alfonso Daniel Rodríguez Castelao from Argentina to Galicia in 1984, which were buried in the Panteón de Galegos Ilustres (Panthenon of Distinguished Galicians), in Santiago de Compostela.

The Medal measures . On the front is a cross designed by Castelao, which is inspired by the monumental stone crucifixes found in Galicia. On a blue background, the motto reads Deus fratresque Gallaeciae. The name of the recipient of the award and the date are inscribed on the back. The medal hangs on entwined chains of white and blue, the national colours of Galicia.

The Castelao Medals are given to a different number of people each year. It is stipulated that the award cannot be given posthumously.

Partial list of laureates

2020 
 A Roda, Xosé Manuel Piñeiro, Ana Peleteiro, Pilar Cernuda and Asociación de Amigos do Camiño de Santiago.

2019 
Benedicta Sánchez, Jeanne Picard, Marisa Crespo, Teresa Portela and the Galician professional collective of netmakers.

See also

 List of European art awards

Notes 

Visual arts awards
Spanish literary awards
Galician awards
Castelao Medal recipients
Annual events in Galicia (Spain)